Lac de Viry is a lake at Viry in the Jura department of France.

Viry